Tapei is an Arafundi language of Papua New Guinea. It is close to Nanubae; the name Alfendio was once used for both.

Locations
Kassell, et al. (2018) list Imanmeri, Wambrumas, and Yamandim as the villages where Nanubae is spoken. Additionally, there are some speakers in Imboin, which also has Andai speakers.

According to Ethnologue, it is spoken in Awim and Imboin villages of Karawari Rural LLG, East Sepik Province.

Phonology
Auwim consonants are:

{| 
| p || t || c || k
|-
| ᵐb || ⁿd || ᶮɟ || ᵑg
|-
| m || n || ɲ || ŋ
|-
|  || r ||  || 
|-
| w ||  || j || 
|}

Vocabulary
The following basic vocabulary words of Alfendio (Tapei) are from Davies & Comrie (1985), as cited in the Trans-New Guinea database:

{| class="wikitable sortable"
! gloss !! Alfendio
|-
! head
| gʌbʌk
|-
! hair
| gaƀɷkduma
|-
! ear
| gunduk
|-
! eye
| nomguamguk
|-
! nose
| bogok
|-
! tooth
| ganžik
|-
! tongue
| danʌmayʌk
|-
! leg
| banambʌk
|-
! louse
| yɩmwin
|-
! dog
| daʷm
|-
! pig
| yay
|-
! bird
| gɩnyɛ
|-
! egg
| mɩnda
|-
! blood
| ʔʌndi
|-
! bone
| džɩmpa; ʔežɩmbʌk
|-
! skin
| gumbukdea
|-
! breast
| yɩdʌk
|-
! tree
| ʔɛt
|-
! man
| nuŋgumidndža
|-
! woman
| nam
|-
! sun
| dum
|-
! moon
| dɩpar
|-
! water
| yɩm
|-
! fire
| yam
|-
! stone
| naŋgum
|-
! road, path
| ʔɩnduŋ
|-
! eat
| nʌmbɩdžik
|-
! one
| kʰundʌpam
|-
! two
| kʰundamwin
|}

References

Arafundi languages
Languages of East Sepik Province